Fool Metal Jack is the tenth studio album by the Brazilian rock band Os Mutantes. Released on April 30, 2013 by the US-based label Krian Music Group, it is the follow-up to Haih Or Amortecedor, Os Mutantes' first studio album in 35 years.

Track listing

References

2013 albums
Os Mutantes albums